Błękitni Stargard is a Polish association football sports club from Stargard. The men's team is currently playing in the fourth-tier III liga, following their 2020–21 relegation from the II liga, the reserve men's team in the fifth division whereas the women's team is in the fourth division. There are also 11 different youth teams. It was formerly a multi-sports club.

History
On 18 May 1945, on the initiative of the athlete Tadeusz Świniarski, a participant of the 1946 European Athletics Championships, Błękitni, the first Polish sports club in Western Pomerania, was founded. The football, boxing and athletics sections were all officially launched in 1945. Two years later, a volleyball section was added. Table tennis and swimming sections followed in 1948 and 1949, respectively.

League history
In 1980–81, Błękitni finished second behind Gryf Słupsk at the third tier and won promotion to the II liga. During the 1981/82 season, the team played in the second division where they finished 15th out of 16 teams and were relegated back to the third tier.

The club played the next 16 seasons in the III liga, managing to finish second on four separate occasions. However, none of these granted them promotion. In 1998, the club was relegated from the third tier having finished 10th. Błękitni spent the next two seasons at the fourth tier - in 1998/99 they were denied promotion by Kotwica Kołobrzeg but won their group next season. However, they didn't manage to keep their spot at the third tier and returned to the fourth level one year later.

After two promotions in succession, in 2002–03, the club returned to the second division  but was withdrawn at the halfway stage of the season, their results annulled.

After being withdrawn from the second tier, Błękitni joined the IV liga, the fourth tier of Polish association football, in 2004 and played for the next nine seasons at that level. In 2013, the club won promotion to the third division and has been playing at the third tier since.

In the Polish Cup
The club had an unprecedented cup run during the 2014–15 season, reaching the semifinals of the Polish Cup. The club was playing in the third division at the time. In the first round, Błękitni won 6–1 with Małapanew Ozimek, lower-tier team. In the second round, the club already eliminated its first higher-level opponent winning 3–1 with Pogoń Siedlce and went on to win against Chojniczanka 1–0 the following round. Both of these opponents were playing in the second division at the time. In the 16th-finals eliminated a fourth-division team, Gryf Wejherowo, 2–1. The following round, Błękitni won with another second-tier team, GKS Tychy, 3–2 and advanced to the quarterfinals which were held in the spring of 2015. Then, having managed to achieve two surprise 2–0 wins, home and away, against Ekstraklasa side Cracovia in the quarterfinals, the team progressed to the semifinals, where they faced Lech Poznań. While Błęktini did win against Lech 3–1 at home, they were eventually knocked out by Lech in the return leg, after losing 1–3 in regular time. In extra time, Lech scored two goals to win the tie 6–4 on aggregate.

Achievements

Association football (men's)
15th place in Second Division: 1981–82
Semifinal of the Polish Cup: 2014–15

Table tennis
Second division: 1957, 1990–2000

Current squad

Notes

References

External links
Official Club website
Unofficial website
90minut.pl profile

Association football clubs established in 1945
1945 establishments in Poland
Football clubs in West Pomeranian Voivodeship